The ebony jewelwing (Calopteryx maculata) is a species of broad-winged damselfly. One of about 150 species of Calopterygidae, it is found in the eastern U.S. and southeastern Canada, ranging west to the Great Plains. Other common names include black-winged damselfly.

Description

It is between 39–57 mm (1.5–2.2 in). The male has a metallic blue-green body and black wings. The female is duller brown with smoky wings that have white spots near the tips (pseudopterostigmata). The naiad is pale brown with darker markings.

Habitat
It lives near wooded streams and rivers, but it can move far from water.

Breeding

Ebony jewelwings mate in the summer. The male holds the female behind her head with his tail or abdomen. The female lays eggs in the soft stems of aquatic plants. The naiad eats small aquatic insects. When the naiad is fully grown, it crawls out of the water and molts.

Flight season
This damselfly species can be seen almost year-round in some regions.

Ecology
Prey of this species includes the tiger mosquito, giant willow aphid, fungus gnats, crane flies, large diving beetles, eastern dobsonfly, water fleas, green darner, aquatic oligochaetes, caddisflies, rotifers, copepods, amphipods, dogwood borer, six-spotted tiger beetle, freshwater triclads, and green hydra.

Predators of this damselfly include birds such as the great crested flycatcher, American robin, mallard, red-winged blackbird, and blue jay, reptiles and amphibians such as the eastern painted turtle, common snapping turtle, and southern leopard frog, fish such as the bluegill, largemouth bass, yellow perch, creek chub, channel catfish, common carp, and northern hogsucker, mammals such as the big brown bat, and insects such as the green darner, large diving beetles, eastern dobsonfly, and common water strider.

The damselfly shelters among various plants and algaes in its habitat, including green algae, yellow water lily, hydrilla, lizard's tail, pickerelweed, common cattail, upright sedge, common bladderwort, common duckweed, black willow, orange jewelweed, spotted Joe-pye weed, poison ivy, wild grape, sassafras, common greenbrier, and buttonbush.

Gallery

References

Calopterygidae
Odonata of North America
Insects of Canada
Insects of the United States
Insects described in 1805